Çeşmeli is a town in Mersin Province, Turkey.

Geography

Çeşmeli is a part of Erdemli district which itself is a part of Mersin Province. The midtown  is situated two kilometers north of Mediterranean seaside and at the east of the rivulet Kargıpınarı (which is also known as Gelinderesi). The coordinates of the town are   The population of the town was 4375 as of 2012.

History
Nothing definite is known about the origin of the town. According to legend, the earliest
settlement was established 300 years ago by a certain Şahin Ali Bey at a location nearer to Mersin. The settlers later on moved to present site, using the name of their former settlement, Çeşmeli (meaning location with a fountain) The township was declared in 1969.

Economy
The major economic activity is agriculture. Çeşmeli along with the neighbouring Kargıpınarı is one of the most important citrus producers of Mersin Province and Mersin Province is the most important citrus producer of Turkey. In recent years floriculture has become another profitable activity. At the coastal strip of the town there are summer houses of city dwellers as well as foreigners and services to summer houses also seem promising.

References

Populated places in Mersin Province
Towns in Turkey
Populated coastal places in Turkey
Populated places in Erdemli District